Qiongthela is a genus of spiders in the family Liphistiidae. , it contains 14 species.

Taxonomy

Qiongthela gets its name from "Qiong-" referring to Hainan Province, China (where some species of this genus are found). "-thela" comes from the Ancient Greek "θηλη" meaning "nipple-like protuberance", referring to the spinnerets. This "-thela" suffix is a tradition for heptatheline genera.

Description

Qiongthela ranges in size from 13-31mm in length (excluding the chelicerae). The male's palp has a long, blade-like conductor with a slightly hook-like apex. The tegulum has two margins and the paracymbium is spinose.

Females have two paired receptacular clusters, situated on the anterior edge of the bursa copulatrix.

Biology

These primitive spiders live in burrows with trapdoors at the entrance. These trapdoors are 3.3 cm wide and 2.5 cm long for females and the males' trapdoors are 2.0-2.3 cm wide and 1.5-1.8 cm long. The hinges of the trapdoor are located at the top and the bottom protrudes slightly. The spiders prefer not to rest near the top of the burrow and will not be coaxed out by flexible grass blades, which will often coax out other genera in the family, e.g. Liphistius.

Egg cases of this genus contain yellow eggs and have more than one hundred individual eggs in them. They are coated in a thin layer of coagulated vulval secretion and some fine silken threads. This structure rests on a mesh of fine threads above the bottom of the inner chamber of the egg case.

When medium to large-sized individuals are disturbed, they rise their bodies up off the ground whilst keeping their tarsi on the ground and spreading their chelicerae. This behaviour is known as "tip-toeing".

Species

Qiongthela is found only in Asia. , the World Spider Catalog accepted 14 species.
Qiongthela australis (Ono, 2002) – Vietnam
Qiongthela baishensis Xu, 2015 – Hainan
Qiongthela baoting Yu, Liu, Zhang, Wang, Li & Xu, 2020 – Hainan
Qiongthela bawang Xu, Liu, Kuntner & Li, 2017 – Hainan
Qiongthela dongfang Yu, Liu, Zhang, Li & Xu, 2021 – Hainan
Qiongthela jianfeng Xu, Liu, Kuntner & Li, 2017 – Hainan
Qiongthela nankai Yu, Liu, Zhang, Li & Xu, 2021 – Hainan
Qiongthela nui (Schwendinger & Ono, 2011)  – Vietnam
Qiongthela qiongzhong Yu, Liu, Zhang, Wang, Li & Xu, 2020 – Hainan
Qiongthela sanya Yu, Liu, Zhang, Wang, Li & Xu, 2020 – Hainan
Qiongthela wuzhi Xu, Liu, Kuntner & Li, 2017 – Hainan
Qiongthela yalin Yu, Liu, Zhang, Li & Xu, 2021 – Hainan
Qiongthela yinai Xu, Liu, Kuntner & Li, 2017 – Hainan
Qiongthela yinggezui Yu, Liu, Zhang, Wang, Li & Xu, 2020 – Hainan

References

Liphistiidae
Mesothelae genera
Spiders of Asia